Drakkar (Khmer: តន្ត្រីដ្រាក្ការ, also known as Drakka Band or Thra Kha Band in some Romanized sources) was a Cambodian hard rock band active in the late 1960s and early 1970s. Their music has been noted as an important late-stage development in Cambodian rock of the 1960s and 70s, a thriving music scene that was abruptly crushed by the Khmer Rouge communists in 1975. Some members of the band did not survive the ensuing Cambodian genocide.

Formation
Drakkar formed in 1967, amid the flourishing Phnom Penh music scene, to perform rock music inspired by The Beatles and The Rolling Stones as well as early Cambodian guitar bands like Baksey Cham Krong and Apsara. As with many of their contemporaries like Sinn Sisamouth, Ros Serey Sothea, and Pen Ran, Drakkar was influenced by pop records imported from France and Latin America that had become popular among musicians in the capital.

The band initially comprised singer/rhythm guitarist Touch Seang Tana, singer/lead guitarist Touch Chhatha, singer/bassist Mam Molivan, and singer Tan Phanareth, and several temporary drummers. This first lineup did not record any original music, and the members, all in their teens or early twenties, disbanded and took military or government jobs.

Reformation and popularity
In 1971, Tana assembled a new lineup with lead guitarist Som Sareth, drummer Ouk Sam Art, and bassist Oer Sam Ol. By this time, the Cambodian music scene had been further influenced by Western rock and roll and soul music via U.S. armed forces radio that had been broadcast to troops stationed nearby during the Vietnam War. Drakkar toured U.S. military bases in South Vietnam that year, after which original lead guitarist Touch Chhatha rejoined. This version of the band was heavily influenced by the hard rock sounds of bands like Deep Purple and Grand Funk Railroad, and regularly performed covers of songs by those and other bands. Their sound at the time has been compared to Led Zeppelin, Santana, and Jimi Hendrix.

The band's hippie attire and long hair were noted as symbolic of changing times and American influences in early-1970s Cambodia. Guitarists Touch Chhatha and Touch Seang Tana attracted attention, not all of it good, for their unusually aggressive guitar playing, while drummer Ouk Sam Art caused minor scandals by playing shirtless. Tana noted in the documentary film Don't Think I've Forgotten that Cambodia was not yet ready for western-style hard rock at the time.

Khmer Rouge era
Drakkar became popular in Phnom Penh during the later stages of the Cambodian Civil War, when the city was under threat from both American bombing campaigns and attacks by Khmer Rouge insurgents. Due to wartime curfews, the band had to play in clubs during the day and often heard nearby gunfire and explosions during their performances. The band recorded a self-titled album with primitive technology in 1972-1973, and released it in early 1974. The album, which was re-released decades later as Drakkar '74, sold over 20,000 copies, making it the highest-selling full-length album in Cambodian history up to that point.

Plans to further promote the album were halted in April 1975, when the Khmer Rouge defeated the Khmer Republic army and gained control of the country. The members of Drakkar are assumed to be among the two million residents of Phnom Penh who were forced to leave the city and become farm workers to fulfill the Khmer Rouge's visions of agrarian socialism and the eradication of all foreign influences (including music) from Cambodian society. Group members Oer Sam Ol and Som Sareth disappeared during the ensuing Cambodian genocide and their exact fates are unknown. Singer/guitarist Touch Seang Tana was imprisoned in a work camp, and claims that he survived the genocide by singing Santana songs to Khmer Rouge soldiers on demand while passing himself off as a common peasant. Guitarist Touch Chhatha was one of many professional musicians who were forced to play patriotic and traditional music for Khmer Rouge troops practically every day.

Post-Khmer Rouge and reunion

After the fall of the Khmer Rouge in 1979, drummer Ouk Sam Art and guitarist Touch Chhatha returned to music work for Cambodia's National Radio station, while Tana became an accomplished manager of fisheries and environmental conservation for the post-Khmer Rouge Cambodian government. Conservation work continued to be a theme in Tana's life.  he was the Chairman of the Cambodian Government's Commission for Dolphin Conservation and Development of the Mekong Dolphin Ecotourism Zone (the "Dolphin Commission").

Information about many Cambodian musicians of the 1960s and 1970s, and many of their recordings, were lost during the Khmer Rouge regime. Interest in that scene's musicians was revived, especially among western rock fans, in the late 1990s with the release of compilation albums like Cambodian Rocks in 1996. Filmmaker John Pirozzi was introduced to the music while making the movie City of Ghosts on location in Cambodia, and subsequently featured Drakkar and several of their contemporaries in the 2015 documentary Don't Think I've Forgotten in 2015. The Drakkar song "Crazy Loving You" has appeared on several compilations, including the Don't Think I've Forgotten soundtrack, and the song "Do You No Wrong Again" (credited to Thra Kha Band) has appeared on compilations like the 2011 CD Cambodia Rock Spectacular! from Lion Productions.

Surviving members of Drakkar first regrouped for a reunion concert in Singapore in 2011. They also performed in 2014 and 2015 to commemorate the release of Don't Think I've Forgotten and announced plans to record a new album. The 2014 performance featured a guest appearance by Chhom Nimol of the Cambodian/American band Dengue Fever. Nimol, whose band was inspired by and frequently covers late-60s and early-70s Khmer pop music, proclaimed "I never dreamed I would play with those musicians. They are like my teachers, my masters." A new version of the band led by Touch Seang Tana began performing regularly under the name Drakka Band in 2015.

Master tapes for Drakkar's 1974 album were unearthed during this period, and in 2014 it was released as Drakkar '74 by Metal Postcard Records. Personnel at the label had been inspired by Cambodian Rocks and Don't Think I've Forgotten to track down the master tapes and remaster them for the digital market. Upon its release, one music critic noted the album's historical importance and hailed it as "The Holy Grail of Cambodian Psych."

References

Cambodian rock music groups
Khmer people
People who died in the Cambodian genocide